Lipographis fenestrella is a species of snout moth in the genus Lipographis. It was described by Packard in 1873, and is known from Baja California North, California, Nevada and Utah.

References

Moths described in 1873
Phycitinae